Fools for Luck is a 1928 American silent comedy film directed by Charles Reisner and written by Harry Fried, George Marion Jr., Sam Mintz, and J. Walter Ruben. The film stars W.C. Fields, Chester Conklin, Sally Blane, Jack Luden, Mary Alden, Arthur Housman, and Robert Dudley. The film was released on June 11, 1928, by Paramount Pictures.

A previous Essanay version starred actor Taylor Holmes in 1917.

Cast 
W.C. Fields as Richard Whitehead
Chester Conklin as Samuel Hunter
Sally Blane as Louise Hunter
Jack Luden	as Ray Caldwell
Mary Alden	as Mrs. Hunter
Arthur Housman as Charles Grogan
Robert Dudley as Jim Simpson
Martha Mattox as Mrs. Simpson

References

External links 

 

1928 films
1920s English-language films
Silent American comedy films
1928 comedy films
Paramount Pictures films
Films directed by Charles Reisner
American black-and-white films
American silent feature films
1920s American films